Tim Stephens is Professor of International Law at the University of Sydney and Fellow of the Australian Academy of Law. Stephens' main areas of research are the international law of the sea and international environmental law.

Early life
Stephens was educated at St Aloysius' College, Sydney, and then at the University of Sydney where he graduated with a B.A. (Hons.), LL.B. (Hons.) and a Ph.D. He read geography and took an MPhil at St John's College, Cambridge.

Career
Stephens is a legal academic and commentator. Prior to taking up an academic appointment at the University of Sydney, he was Associate to the Hon Justice Arthur Emmett AO in the Federal Court of Australia. He has authored, co-authored or edited ten books, including International Courts and Environmental Protection (Cambridge University Press, Cambridge, 2009). In 2010 he was awarded the International Union for Conservation of Nature (IUCN) Academy of Environmental Law Junior Scholarship Prize for ‘outstanding scholarship and contributions in the field of international environmental law’. In 2014 he was appointed along with Professor  AM, on the nomination of the Australian Government, to the List of Experts for the South Pacific Regional Fisheries Management Organisation. Stephens served as president of the Australian and New Zealand Society of International Law from 2015 to 2019. He was elected a Fellow of the Australian Academy of Law in 2020.

In 2021 Stephens was elected to the Inner West Council, representing the Leichardt-Gulgadya Ward. Stephens' election was considered a 'surprise' as he was second on the Labor Party's ticket for the ward.

Books
VanderZwaag, D., Oral, N., Stephens, T. (2021). Research Handbook on Ocean Acidification Law and Policy. Cheltenham, UK: Edward Elgar Publishing.
Craik, N., Jefferies, C., Seck, S., Stephens, T. (2018). Global Environmental Change and Innovation in International Law. Cambridge: Cambridge University Press.
Saul, B., Stephens, T. (2015). Antarctica in International Law. United Kingdom: Bloomsbury Publishing.
Rothwell, D., Oude Elferink, A., Scott, K., Stephens, T. (2015). The Oxford Handbook of the Law of the Sea. United Kingdom: Oxford University Press.
Butt, S., Lyster, R., Stephens, T. (2015). Climate Change and Forest Governance: Lessons from Indonesia. United Kingdom: Routledge.
Stephens, T., VanderZwaag, D. (2014). Polar Oceans Governance in an Era of Environmental Change. Cheltenham & Northampton: Edward Elgar Publishing.
Saul, B., Sherwood, S., McAdam, J., Stephens, T., Slezak, J. (2012). Climate Change and Australia: Warming to the Global Challenge. Sydney: The Federation Press.
Rothwell, D., Stephens, T. (Second Edition, 2016; First Edition, 2010). The International Law of the Sea. Oxford, United Kingdom: Bloomsbury / Hart Publishing.

References

Living people
International law scholars
Alumni of St John's College, Cambridge
21st-century Australian lawyers
Sydney Law School alumni
Academic staff of the University of Sydney
1975 births
Non-fiction environmental writers